The 1925–26 season was Port Vale's seventh consecutive season of football (20th overall) in the English Football League. They improved on their previous season's success by two points. They finished in a higher league position than rivals Stoke City for only the second time in their history, and with Stoke relegated in 21st place, they guaranteed playing in a higher league than Stoke for the first time in their history. With seven games left to play, April 1926 would be arguably the club's best ever chance at reaching the top flight; however, they tallied just two points from their remaining games to finish in eighth place. Despite all of this, the Vale board proposed a merger with Stoke City, and were forced to resign en-masse when the scheme failed.

A tale of two teams, their home record was the fourth strongest in the division; however, away from home they recorded just four victories. The key performer was Wilf Kirkham by quite some distance, who racked up a club record 35 Football League goal tally that only he himself would better.

Overview

Second Division
The pre-season was quiet, with all the club satisfied with the staff and players of the previous campaign. The game itself was changed by the offside rule being modified so that two defenders, rather than three, had to be between the attackers and the goal in order to spring the offside trap – this would have significant beneficial consequences for young forward Wilf Kirkham.

The season started with two wins, the second being a 3–0 home win over cross-town rivals Stoke. This was followed by a demolition job by Chelsea, who adapted to the new offside rule with a new 'W formation' – to devastating effects. The "Valiants" recovered quickly with another 3–0 win over Stoke – Kirkham scoring five of the six derby goals over the two matches. Following a poor display against Hull City, the Vale changed their defensive formation to better combat the new tactics used to exploit the new offside rule. They also dropped their short-passing attacking game in favour of a long ball system that utilized the wings, this resulted in a 6–1 rout of Darlington. Offers came in for a number of Vale's talent, all of which were rejected.

During the mid-season Vale suffered indifferent form, winning at home but losing away. The cold weather was blamed for the low crowds, and the selling of players was considered. Kirkham's form also suffered, as Vale found difficulty in finding the net. In January the club celebrated its Golden jubilee, this established 1876 as their founding date despite some doubts over the exact year of the club's founding. On the pitch, the club went down 4–0 at Darlington. This defeat was followed by a sequence of seven wins in eight games, including a 5–0 win over Blackpool thanks to four goals from Alfred Strange. The team also picked up two rare away wins, including a 2–0 victory at eventual champions The Wednesday. However in March, young right-back Tom Cooper was sold to eventual promotion-winners Derby County for £2,500. Cooper would later play for Liverpool and England.

In fourth position, four points from the promotion zone, on a tremendous run of form, hopes were high for the club's first ever promotion to the top-flight. This hope was crushed with two points from their final seven games, their 1–0 defeat at home Fulham would have significant consequences for neighbours Stoke, who would have avoided relegation if the Vale had recorded a draw.

All positive thoughts were totally extinguished on 16 April 1926, when the Port Vale directors announced that they had agreed in principle to an amalgamation with Stoke City. Chairman Walker stated that low attendances and high wages meant Port Vale had probably reached their zenith, and a merger with City would allow one Stoke-on-Trent club to perform better than Port Vale ever could. Vale fans did not share his view, and organized themselves in Hanley and Burslem to deliver a message that they would not support the proposed new club. On 19 May the Stoke directors backed out of the discussions, leaving the Vale directors and chairman to resign in failure.

Finances
New chairman Frank Huntbach took over in May 1926 at a time of relative financial stability. He discovered a £1,950 profit had been made on the season, though may have been concerned that gate receipts had fallen £1,302 despite a campaign that took the club close to promotion.

Cup competitions
In the FA Cup, Vale were handed a home tie in the third round against First Division Manchester United. A hard-fought contest, Vale lost 3–2 in front of a disappointing crowd of 14,841, raising £1,150 in gate receipts. United would go on to the semi-finals, where they would lose 3–0 to derby rivals, and eventual runners-up, Manchester City.

League table

Results
Port Vale's score comes first

Football League Second Division

Results by matchday

Matches

FA Cup

Player statistics

Appearances

Top scorers

Transfers

Transfers in

Transfers out

References
Specific

General

Port Vale F.C. seasons
Port Vale